Palatal harmony, also called palatovelar harmony, is a type of vowel harmony that manifests in forcing agreement between vowels that are either neighboring or in the same word regarding their place of articulation-- specifically the difference between the palatal-articulated front vowels and the back vowels which are articulated closer to the velum. It is found in Finno-Ugric and Turkic languages, as well as the North American languages of Yawelmani and many others. Under the palatal harmony rule a word may contain either all back vowels or front vowels.

Turkish
Vowel harmony in Turkish and other Turkic languages has "multiple features" — in some cases, agreement between vowels is required with respect to more than one distinctive feature. One of those features is called "backness" or what is more formally called palatal harmony. While all Turkic vowels agree in "backness" (palatal harmony), some high vowels may also agree in "roundness" (labial harmony). For example, the root vowel in the word , meaning face, is rounded, but the nominative plural suffix  only agrees with the root vowel in backness, not roundness. The genitive singular suffix -ün, as in  agrees with the root vowel in respect to both backness and roundness.

Several examples from Turkish demonstrate roundness harmony with backness (palatal) harmony (note that  in Turkish is strictly a back vowel) :

In the above examples, the suffix vowel alternates with vowel backness and roundness, but not vowel height.

Turkic languages

Chagatay
Vowels in Chagatay Turkic exhibits palatal harmony with back vowels (suffixes containing ) or front vowels (suffixes containing ):

References

Assimilation (linguistics)